The 1946 Limerick Senior Hurling Championship was the 52nd staging of the Limerick Senior Hurling Championship since its establishment by the Limerick County Board.

Ahane were the defending champions.

Ahane won the championship after a 6-07 to 1-01 defeat of Croom in the final. It was their 13th championship title overall and their fifth title in succession.

Results

Final

References

Limerick Senior Hurling Championship
Limerick Senior Hurling Championship